Boonton is a NJ Transit station in Boonton, Morris County, New Jersey, United States along the Montclair-Boonton Line. It is located on Main Street (County Route 511), near Myrtle Avenue (U.S. Route 202) and I-287. The original 1905 station was built by architect Frank J. Nies who built other stations for the Delaware, Lackawanna and Western Railroad. Unlike most of his stations which tended to be massive Renaissance structures, Boonton station was built as a simple Prairie House design. The station house is now a bar, and was added to the National Register of Historic Places on July 13, 1977, two years before the establishment of New Jersey Transit and six years before becoming part of their railroad division.

Station layout
Boonton has one mini-high level side platform.

See also
Operating Passenger Railroad Stations Thematic Resource (New Jersey)
National Register of Historic Places listings in Morris County, New Jersey

Bibliography

References

External links
 

1907 post card of Boonton DL&W Station (The Erie-Lackawanna Archives)
 Main Street entrance from Google Maps Street View

NJ Transit Rail Operations stations
Railway stations in the United States opened in 1867
Former Delaware, Lackawanna and Western Railroad stations
Boonton, New Jersey
Railway stations in Morris County, New Jersey
Railway stations on the National Register of Historic Places in New Jersey
Prairie School architecture in New Jersey
1867 establishments in New Jersey
New Jersey Register of Historic Places